Dr Ali Sheikh Ahmed is the founding Member and Former president of Mogadishu University.

Career
Ahmed has been involved in Islamic and academic initiatives and was one of the five founding members of the Islamic peace union Al Islah movement in Somalia. Additionally, he was a member and one of the founders of the “Somali Civic Forum”, a reconciliation panel formed in 2004.

See also
Mogadishu University

References

Living people
Ethnic Somali people
Academic staff of King Saud University
Islamic University of Madinah alumni
Academic staff of Mogadishu University
Year of birth missing (living people)